Candidid is a skin condition, an id reaction, similar to dermatophytids.

See also 
 Candidiasis
 List of cutaneous conditions

References

External links 

Mycosis-related cutaneous conditions